Leali is an Italian surname. Notable people with the surname include:

Bruno Leali (born 1958), Italian cyclist
Fausto Leali (born 1944), Italian singer
Nicola Leali (born 1993), Italian footballer

Italian-language surnames